The 2000 United States presidential election in Washington took place on November 7, 2000, and was part of the 2000 United States presidential election. Voters chose 11 representatives, or electors to the Electoral College, who voted for president and vice president.

The State of Washington was considered a competitive swing state in 2000, and both campaigns sent advertisements into the state. On election day, Gore won the state with a margin of 5.6%. Gore's best performance in the state was in King County, also the largest populated county, which he won with 60% of the vote. , this is the last election in which Whatcom County voted for the Republican candidate.

Results

By county

Counties that flipped from Democratic to Republican
Asotin (Largest city: Clarkston)
Clallam (Largest city: Port Angeles)
Clark (Largest city: Vancouver)
Ferry (Largest city: Republic)
Klickitat (Largest city: Goldendale)
Pend Oreille (Largest city: Newport)
Skagit (Largest city: Mount Vernon)
Skamania (Largest city: Carson)
Spokane (Largest city: Spokane)
Wahkiakum (Largest city: Puget Island)
Whatcom (Largest city: Bellingham)
Whitman (Largest city: Pullman)

By congressional district
Gore won 6 of 9 congressional districts. Both candidates won a district held by the other party.

Electors
Rachel Lake
Debbie Aldrich
Paul Steinberg
Carol Sue Perkins
Tim Hattenburg
Debbie Regala
Vic Battson
Carl Schwartz
Nancy McGinnis
Jim Frush
Charlotte Coker

See also
 United States presidential elections in Washington (state)
 Presidency of George W. Bush

References

External links

Washington
2000 Washington (state) elections
2000